The South Siberian Mountains are one of the largest mountain systems of the Russian Federation. The total area of the system of mountain ranges is more than 1.5 million km². The South Siberian Mountains are located in the Siberian and Far Eastern Federal Districts of Russia, as well as partly in Mongolia. The territory of the mountain system is one of the Great Russian Regions.

Geography
The system is composed of a number of ranges aligned in an east–west direction stretching for almost . Part of them are near the border with Mongolia and China, while others rise further north. 
To the south the South Siberian ranges merge with the Mongolian and Chinese mountain chains and plateaus. In the west lies the Dzungarian Basin and to the east the Mongolian Plateau. To the north the South Siberian Mountains merge with the West Siberian Lowland and the Central Siberian Plateau, both on the Russian side. To the southeast the Baikal Range is separated from the Eastern Sayan by the Baikal Rift Zone and the Tunkin Depression. To the northeast of its eastern end the South Siberian mountain system merges with the East Siberian Mountains.

Geologically the mountains of the system underwent a process of rejuvenation during the Alpine orogeny. Earthquakes are common all across the area of the system.

Owing to the mountainous terrain, large swathes of the South Siberian system are uninhabited. The main cities of the vast region are, from west to east: Krasnoyarsk, Angarsk, Irkutsk, Ulan-Ude and Chita.

Ranges

Altai Mountains 
Saylyugem Mountains
Chuya Belki
Kuray Mountains

Salair Ridge
Kuznetsk Alatau
Koshkulak (mountain range)
Kharatas ridge
Sunduki mountain range
Sayan Mountains ( Western and Eastern )
Ergaki
Kitoy Range
Kropotkin Range (Eastern Sayan)
Tannu Ola
Baikal Range
Khamar Daban
Ulan-Burgas
Barguzin Range
Yablonoi Mountains
Chersky Range (Transbaikalia)
Olyokma-Stanovik
Khentei-Daur Highlands
Khentei Range
Chikokon Range
Stanovik Range
Ikat Range
Vitim Plateau
Bolshoy Khapton
Selenga Highlands
Stanovoy Highlands
Kalar Range
Udokan Range
Kodar Range
Delyun-Uran Range
Northern Muya Range
Southern Muya Range
North Baikal Highlands
Akitkan Range
Synnyr Massif
Upper Angara Range
Patom Highlands
Kropotkin Range
Olyokma-Chara Plateau
Aldan Highlands
Sunnagyn Range
Stanovoy Range
Toko-Stanovik
Primorsky Range

Hydrography
Some of the main rivers of Siberia have their origin in the South Siberian mountain system, such as the Lena, Irtysh, the Yenisei and the Ob River. Other rivers of the area are the Argun, Tom, Shilka, Selenga, Katun and the Biya River. The great Lake Baikal is the most well-known lake of the region. Other much smaller lakes are Lake Teletskoye, Lake Markakol, Lake Todzha (Azas), Baunt and Noyon-Khol.

See also

Golets (geography)
List of ecoregions in Russia

References